Christa Riffel (born 30 July 1998) is a German racing cyclist, who currently rides for UCI Women's Continental Team . She rode in the women's road race event at the 2018 UCI Road World Championships.

References

External links
 

1998 births
Living people
German female cyclists
Sportspeople from Karlsruhe
European Games competitors for Germany
Cyclists at the 2019 European Games
Cyclists from Baden-Württemberg
20th-century German women
21st-century German women